Cheke's wood rail (Dryolimnas chekei), also known as Sauzier's wood rail, is an extinct species of rail which was endemic to the Mascarene island of Mauritius. It was described by British ornithologist Julian P. Hume in 2019, and the name honours British ecologist Anthony S. Cheke.

Previously mentioned as an undescribed extinct taxon and provisionally named Sauzier's wood-rail or Dryolimnas sp., until it was described as new species in 2019. It is known from Mauritius and was originally thought to be an isolated population of D. cuvieri cuvieri, which is a rare vagrant to Mauritius, until analysis of the fossils found it to be a distinct flightless taxon that is likely descended from D. cuvieri. This species may be the "small rail" referred to in the accounts of Dutch explorers, in contrast to the "large rail" which may be the red rail.

References 

Extinct birds of Indian Ocean islands
Bird extinctions since 1500
Birds of Mauritius
Birds described in 2019